is a former Nippon Professional Baseball pitcher.

Asuka Kuramochi, his daughter, is one of the members of female idol group AKB48.

External links

1952 births
Living people
People from Yokohama
Japanese baseball players
Nippon Professional Baseball pitchers
Lotte Orions players
Crown Lighter Lions players
Yakult Swallows players